Jean-François Lyotard (10 August 1924 – 21 April 1998) was a French philosopher, sociologist, and literary theorist. His interdisciplinary discourse spans such topics as epistemology and communication, the human body, modern art and postmodern art, literature and critical theory, music, film, time and memory, space, the city and landscape, the sublime, and the relation between aesthetics and politics. He is best known for his articulation of postmodernism after the late 1970s and the analysis of the impact of postmodernity on the human condition. Lyotard was a key personality in contemporary Continental philosophy and author of 26 books and many articles. He was a director of the International College of Philosophy founded by Jacques Derrida, François Châtelet, Jean-Pierre Faye, and Dominique Lecourt.

Biography

Early life, educational background, and family 

Jean François Lyotard was born on August 10, 1924, in Vincennes, France, to Jean-Pierre Lyotard, a sales representative, and Madeleine Cavalli. He went to school at the Lycée Buffon (1935–42) and Louis-le-Grand, Paris. As a child, Lyotard had many aspirations: to be an artist, a historian, a Dominican friar, and a writer. He later gave up the dream of becoming a writer when he finished writing an unsuccessful fictional novel at the age of 15. Ultimately, Lyotard described the realization that he would not become any of these occupations because of "fate", as he describes in his intellectual biography called Peregrinations, published in 1988.

Lyotard served as a medic during the liberation of Paris in the Second World War, and soon after began studying philosophy at the Sorbonne in the late 1940s, after failing the entrance exam to the more prestigious École normale supérieure twice. His 1947 DES thesis, Indifference as an Ethical Concept (L'indifférence comme notion éthique), analyzed forms of indifference and detachment in Zen Buddhism, Stoicism, Taoism, and Epicureanism. He studied for the agrégation at the Sorbonne alongside fellow students Gilles Deleuze, Francois Châtelet and Michel Butor; in 1949 whilst waiting to re-take the oral examination he left Paris to teach at l’École militaire préparatoire d’Autun. Having gained the agrégation in 1950, Lyotard took up a position teaching philosophy at the lycée in Constantine in French Algeria but returned to mainland France in 1952 to teach at the Prytanée military academy in La Flèche, where he wrote a short work on Phenomenology, published in 1954.  Lyotard moved to Paris in 1959 to teach at the Sorbonne: introductory lectures from this time (1964) have been posthumously published under the title Why Philosophize?  Having moved to teach at the new campus of Nanterre in 1966, Lyotard participated in the events following March 22 and the tumult of May 1968. In 1971, Lyotard earned a State doctorate with his dissertation Discours, figure under Mikel Dufrenne—the work was published the same year. Lyotard joined the Philosophy department of the experimental University at Vincennes, later Paris 8, together with Gilles Deleuze, in the academic year 1970-71; it remained his academic home in France until 1987. He married his first wife, Andrée May, in 1948 with whom he had two children, Corinne and Laurence, and later married for a second time in 1993 to Dolores Djidzek, the mother of his son David (born in 1986).

Political life

In 1954, Lyotard became a member of Socialisme ou Barbarie ("Socialism or Barbarism"), a French political organization formed in 1948 around the inadequacy of the Trotskyist analysis to explain the new forms of domination in the Soviet Union. Socialisme ou Barbarie and the publication of the same name had an objective to conduct a critique of Marxism from within the left, including the dominance of bureaucracy within the French Communist Party and its adherence to the dictats of the Soviet Union. His writings in this period are mostly concerned with far-left politics, with a focus on the Algerian situation—which he witnessed first-hand while teaching philosophy in Constantine. As the principle correspondent on Algeria for Socialisme ou Barbarie, during the period of Algeria's struggle for independence, Lyotard wrote a dozen essays analyzing the economic and political situation (1956–63), which were later reproduced in La Guerre des Algeriens (1989) and translated in Political Writings (1993). Lyotard hoped to encourage an Algerian fight for independence from France, and a social revolution, actively supporting the FLN in secret, whilst also being critical of its approach. Following disputes with Cornelius Castoriadis in 1964, Lyotard left Socialisme ou Barbarie for the newly formed splinter group Pouvoir Ouvrier ("Worker Power"), from which he resigned in turn in 1966. Although Lyotard played an active part in the May 1968 uprisings, he distanced himself from revolutionary Marxism with his 1974 book Libidinal Economy. He distanced himself from Marxism because he felt that Marxism had a rigid structuralist approach and they were imposing "systematization of desires" through a strong emphasis on industrial production as the ground culture.

Academic career
In 1952 Lyotard returned to mainland France to teach at the Prytanée military academy, La Flèche, Sarthe. He published the book La phénoménologie (Phenomenology) in 1954 and began to write for the journal Socialisme ou Barbarie under the pseudonym François Laborde. Returning to Paris in 1959 Lyotard taught first at the Sorbonne, then moving to its recently created Nanterre campus in 1966. In 1970, Lyotard began teaching in the Philosophy department of the Experimental University Centre, Vincennes, which became the University of Paris VIII in 1971; he taught there until 1987 when he became Professor Emeritus. In 1982-3 Lyotard was involved in the foundation of the Collège International de Philosophie, Paris, serving as its second Director in 1985. Lyotard frequently lectured outside France as visiting professor at universities around the world. From 1974, these included trans-Atlantic visits, including: Johns Hopkins University, University of California, Berkeley, Yale University, Stony Brook University and the University of California, San Diego in the U.S., the Université de Montréal in Quebec (Canada), and the University of São Paulo in Brazil. In 1987 he took a part-time professorship at the University of California, Irvine where he held a joint post with Jacques Derrida and Wolfgang Iser in the Department of Critical Theory. Before his death, he split his time between Paris and Atlanta, where he taught at Emory University as the Woodruff Professor of Philosophy and French from 1995-8. He was also a professor of Media Philosophy at The European Graduate School.

Work

Lyotard's work is characterized by a persistent opposition to universals, métarécits (meta-narratives), and generality. He is fiercely critical of many of the "universalist" claims of the Enlightenment, and several of his works serve to undermine the fundamental principles that generate these broad claims.

In his writings of the early 1970s, he rejects what he regards as theological underpinnings of both Karl Marx and Sigmund Freud: "In Freud, it is Judaical, critical sombre (forgetful of the political); in Marx it is catholic. Hegelian, reconciliatory (...) in the one and in the other the relationship of the economic with meaning is blocked in the category of representation (...) Here a politics, there a therapeutics, in both cases a laical theology, on top of the arbitrariness and the roaming of forces". Consequently, he rejected Theodor W. Adorno's negative dialectics because he viewed them as seeking a "therapeutic resolution in the framework of a religion, here the religion of history." In Lyotard's "libidinal economics" he aimed at "discovering and describing different social modes of investment of libidinal intensities".

Academic legacy 
Throughout his academic career Jean-François Lyotard has contributed to the magazines L'Âge nouveau, Les Temps modernes, Socialisme ou barbarie, Cahiers de philosophie, Esprit, Revue d'esthétique, Musique en jeu, L'Art vivant, Semiotexte, October, Art Press International, Critique, Flash Art, Art Forum, Po&sie, among others.

The Postmodern Condition
Lyotard is a skeptic of modern cultural thought. According to his 1979 The Postmodern Condition: A Report on Knowledge, the impact of the postmodern condition was to provoke skepticism about universalizing theories. Lyotard argues that we have outgrown our needs for metanarratives due to the advancement of techniques and technologies since World War II. He argues against the possibility of justifying the narratives that bring together disciplines and social practices, such as science and culture; according to James Williams, for Lyotard "the narratives we tell to justify a single set of laws and stakes are inherently unjust." Lyotard further claims "even under fascism, politics is a matter of opinions and hence values." A loss of faith in metanarratives has an effect on how we view science, art, and literature. Little narratives have now become the appropriate way for explaining social transformations and political problems. Lyotard argues that this is the driving force behind postmodern science. As metanarratives fade, science suffers a loss of faith in its search for truth, and therefore must find other ways of legitimating its efforts. Connected to this scientific legitimacy is the growing dominance for information machines. Lyotard argues that one day, in order for knowledge to be considered useful, it will have to be converted into computerized data. Years later, this led him into writing his book The Inhuman, published in 1988, in which he illustrates a world where technology has taken over.

The Inhuman (1988) 
In his book, The Inhuman, Lyotard explores the philosophy of Kant, Heidegger, Adorno, and Derrida, as well as the works of modernist and postmodernist artists like Cézanne, Debussy, and Boulez, in a wide-ranging debate. Time and memory, the sublime and the avant-garde, and the link between aesthetics and politics are all topics Lyotard addresses in the book. In his study he analyzes the close but problematic ties between modernity, development, and humanity, as well as the shift to postmodernity. The job of literature, philosophy, and the arts, according to Lyotard, is to give witness to and explain this arduous shift.

Lyotard rejected classical humanism mainly because he paradoxically assumes that the humane is something that every person has inherently from birth but can only be realized through education. Lyotard essentially asks if humanity is so inherent to all of us, can we only gain it by undergoing education? By using the concept of the inhuman, Lyotard described all those things that humanism has excluded from its definition of man.

He developed a science fiction thought experiment that would take place in 4.5 billion years, at the time of the explosion of the sun. Should the human species put itself in the position to live on without Earth, and if so what would then remain of "humanity"? Everything that is of importance for our present determination of what is "human" would fall away if the human species began living an extra-planetary existence. Lyotard's opinion on this remained divided: on the one hand, he criticized the dehumanizing effects of modern technology that can already be observed today; on the other hand, he saw in them the chance to open up a space of possibilities, since they do not fix the human being to one image.

The collapse of the "grand narrative" and "language-games"

Most famously, in La Condition postmoderne: Rapport sur le savoir (The Postmodern Condition: A Report on Knowledge) (1979), he proposes what he calls an extreme simplification of the "postmodern" as an 'incredulity towards meta-narratives'. These meta-narratives—sometimes 'grand narratives'—are grand, large-scale theories and philosophies of the world, such as the progress of history, the knowability of everything by science, and the possibility of absolute freedom. Lyotard argues that we have ceased to believe that narratives of this kind are adequate to represent and contain us all. He points out that no one seemed to agree on what, if anything, was real and everyone had their own perspective and story. We have become alert to difference, diversity, the incompatibility of our aspirations, beliefs, and desires, and for that reason postmodernity is characterized by an abundance of micronarratives. For this concept, Lyotard draws from the notion of "language-games" found in the work of Ludwig Wittgenstein. Lyotard notes that it is based on the mapping of society according to the concept of the language games.

In Lyotard's works, the term "language games", sometimes also called "phrase regimens", denotes the multiplicity of communities of meaning, the innumerable and incommensurable separate systems in which meanings are produced and rules for their circulation are created. This involves, for example, an incredulity towards the metanarrative of human emancipation.

That is, the story of how the human race has set itself free. That brings together the language game of science, the language game of human historical conflicts, and the language game of human qualities into the overall justification of the steady development of the human race in terms of wealth and moral well-being.

According to this metanarrative, the justification of science is related to wealth and education. The development of history is seen as steady progress towards civilization or moral well-being. The language game of human passions, qualities and faults (c.f. character flaws (narratives)), is seen as steadily shifting in favor of our qualities and away from our faults as science and historical developments help us to conquer our faults in favor of our qualities. The point is that any event ought to be able to be understood in terms of the justifications of this metanarrative; anything that happens can be understood and judged according to the discourse of human emancipation. For example, for any new social, political or scientific revolution we could ask the question, "Is this revolution a step towards the greater well-being of the mass of human beings?" It should always be possible to answer this question in terms of the rules of justification of the metanarrative of human emancipation.

This becomes more crucial in Au juste: Conversations (Just Gaming) (1979) and Le Différend (The Differend) (1983), which develop a postmodern theory of justice. It might appear that the atomization of human beings implied by the notion of the micronarrative and the language game suggests a collapse of ethics. It has often been thought that universality is a condition for something to be a properly ethical statement: "thou shalt not steal" is an ethical statement in a way that "thou shalt not steal from Margaret" is not. The latter is too particular to be an ethical statement (what's so special about Margaret?); it is only ethical if it rests on a universal statement ("thou shalt not steal from anyone"). But universals are impermissible in a world that has lost faith in metanarratives, and so it would seem that ethics is impossible. Justice and injustice can only be terms within language games, and the universality of ethics is out of the window. Lyotard argues that notions of justice and injustice do in fact remain in postmodernism. The new definition of injustice is indeed to use the language rules from one "phrase regimen" and apply them to another. Ethical behavior is about remaining alert precisely to the threat of this injustice, about paying attention to things in their particularity and not enclosing them within abstract conceptuality. One must bear witness to the "differend". In a differend, there is a conflict between two parties that cannot be solved in a just manner. However, the act of being able to bridge the two and understand the claims of both parties, is the first step towards finding a solution.

"I would like to call a differend the case where the plaintiff is divested of the means to argue and becomes for that reason a victim. If the addressor, the addressee, and the sense of the testimony are neutralized, everything takes place as if there were no damages. A case of differend between two parties takes place when the regulation of the conflict that opposes them is done in the idiom of one of the parties while the wrong suffered by the other is not signified in that idiom."

In more than one book, Lyotard promoted what he called a new paganism.  Plato, in Book II of the Republic, condemns pagans for their shape-shifting and deceitful gods, antithetical to universal truth.  Lyotard prefers a mirror image of Plato's critique, vindicating the pagans as Plato sees them. A new paganism would revolt against a Greek masculinist, such as that of Plato. The revolt would be led by women, for woman is antirational and anti-philosophical (at least as Plato understands what it is to be philosophical).  Woman, as "the little girl", is "the antonym of the adult male questioner" and would release us from the mental illness evident in Platonic philosophy, in Judaism and in the American, French and Russian revolutions.

The Differend

In The Differend, based on Immanuel Kant's views on the separation of Understanding, Judgment, and Reason, Lyotard identifies the moment in which language fails as the differend, and explains it as follows: "...the unstable state and instant of language wherein something which must be able to be put into phrases cannot yet be… the human beings who thought they could use language as an instrument of communication, learn through the feeling of pain which accompanies silence (and of pleasure which accompanies the invention of a new idiom)". Lyotard undermines the common view that the meanings of phrases can be determined by what they refer to (the referent). The meaning of a phrase—an event (something happens)--cannot be fixed by appealing to reality (what actually happened). Lyotard develops this view of language by defining "reality" in an original way, as a complex of possible senses attached to a referent through a name. The correct sense of a phrase cannot be determined by a reference to reality, since the referent itself does not fix sense, and reality itself is defined as the complex of competing senses attached to a referent. Therefore, the phrase event remains indeterminate.

Lyotard uses the example of Auschwitz and the revisionist historian Robert Faurisson’s demands for proof of the Holocaust to show how the differend operates as a double bind. Faurisson argued that "the Nazi genocide of 6 million Jewish people was a hoax and a swindle, rather than a historical fact" and that "he was one of the courageous few willing to expose this wicked conspiracy". Faurisson will only accept proof of the existence of gas chambers from eyewitnesses who were themselves victims of the gas chambers. However, any such eyewitnesses are dead and are not able to testify. Either there were no gas chambers, in which case there would be no eyewitnesses to produce evidence, or there were gas chambers, in which case there would still be no eyewitnesses to produce evidence, because they would be dead. Since Faurisson will accept no evidence for the existence of gas chambers, except the testimony of actual victims, he will conclude from both possibilities (gas chambers existed and gas chambers did not exist) that gas chambers did not exist. This presents a double bind. There are two alternatives, either there were gas chambers or there were not, which lead to the same conclusion: there were no gas chambers (and no final solution). The case is a differend because the harm done to the victims cannot be presented in the standard of judgment upheld by Faurisson.

The sublime
Lyotard was a frequent writer on aesthetic matters. He was, despite his reputation as a postmodernist, a great promoter of modernist art. Lyotard saw postmodernism as a latent tendency within thought throughout time and not a narrowly limited historical period. He favored the startling and perplexing works of the high modernist avant-garde. In them he found a demonstration of the limits of our conceptuality, a valuable lesson for anyone too imbued with Enlightenment confidence. Lyotard has written extensively also on many contemporary artists of his choice: Valerio Adami, Daniel Buren, Marcel Duchamp, Jacques Monory, Ruth Francken, Shusaku Arakawa, Bracha Ettinger, Sam Francis, Karel Appel, Barnett Newman, René Guiffrey, Gianfranco Baruchello, and Albert Ayme as well as on earlier artists, notably Paul Cézanne and Paul Klee.

He developed these themes in particular by discussing the sublime. The "sublime" is a term in aesthetics whose fortunes revived under postmodernism after a century or more of neglect. It refers to the experience of pleasurable anxiety that we experience when confronting wild and threatening sights like, for example, a massive craggy mountain, black against the sky, looming terrifyingly in our vision. A sublime is the conjunction of two opposed feelings, which makes it harder for us to see the injustice of it, or a solution to it.

Lyotard found particularly interesting the explanation of the sublime offered by Immanuel Kant in his Critique of Judgment (Kritik der Urtheilskraft, more exactly Critique of the Power of Judgment). In this book, Kant explains this mixture of anxiety and pleasure in the following terms: there are two kinds of "sublime" experience. In the "mathematically" sublime, an object strikes the mind in such a way that we find ourselves unable to take it in as a whole. More precisely, we experience a clash between our reason (which tells us that all objects are finite) and the imagination (the aspect of the mind that organizes what we see, and which sees an object incalculably larger than ourselves, and feels infinite). In the "dynamically" sublime, the mind recoils at an object so immeasurably more powerful than we, whose weight, force, scale could crush us without the remotest hope of our being able to resist it. (Kant stresses that if we are in actual danger, our feeling of anxiety is very different from that of a sublime feeling. The sublime is an aesthetic experience, not a practical feeling of personal danger.) This explains the feeling of anxiety.

What is deeply unsettling about the mathematically sublime is that the mental faculties that present visual perceptions to the mind are inadequate to the concept corresponding to it; in other words, what we are able to make ourselves see cannot fully match up to what we know is there. We know it is a mountain but we cannot take the whole thing into our perception. Our sensibility is incapable of coping with such sights, but our reason can assert the finitude of the presentation. With the dynamically sublime, our sense of physical danger should prompt an awareness that we are not just physical material beings, but moral and (in Kant's terms) noumenal beings as well. The body may be dwarfed by its power but our reason need not be. This explains, in both cases, why the sublime is an experience of pleasure as well as pain.

Lyotard is fascinated by this admission, from one of the philosophical architects of the Enlightenment, that the mind cannot always organize the world rationally. Some objects are simply incapable of being brought neatly under concepts. For Lyotard, in Lessons on the Analytic of the Sublime, but drawing on his argument in The Differend, this is a good thing. Such generalities as "concepts" fail to pay proper attention to the particularity of things. What happens in the sublime is a crisis where we realize the inadequacy of the imagination and reason to each other. What we are witnessing, says Lyotard, is actually the different; the straining of the mind at the edges of itself and at the edges of its conceptuality.

Aesthetics 
Lyotard's thesis, published under the title Discours, Figure (1971), focused on aesthetics. Lyotard devoted himself a lot to aesthetic issues, in a way that sought to break with the Hegelian perspective, in which art had to think of itself as a materialization of the mind. He believed it was "more a tool to expose often unseen tensions, shifts, and complications in philosophical thinking and its relations with society--a way of helping it depart from doxa without the assurances of higher knowledge or even a sensus communis."  Lyotard's thought on modern and contemporary art focused on a few artists who allowed him to emphasize the flagship issues of French thought after the Second World War, particularly those of conceptual mastery of the artist as an author: Paul Cézanne and Wassily Kandinsky as well as Bracha L. Ettinger, Albert Ayme, Daniel Buren, Marcel Duchamp, Valerio Adami, Jacques Monory, Shusaku Arakawa, Ruth Francken, Sam Francis, Barnett Newman, Joseph Kosuth, Karel Appel, René Guiffrey, and Gianfranco Baruchello.

Libidinal Economy

In one of Lyotard's most famous books, Libidinal Economy, he offers a critique of Marx’s idea of "false consciousness" and claims that the 19th-century working class enjoyed being a part of the industrialization process. Lyotard claims that this was due to libidinal energythe term "libidinal" coming from the term libido, used in psychoanalysis to refer to the desires of our deeper consciousness. Libidinal Economy has been called an achievement in our attempts to live with the rejection of all religious and moral principles through an undermining of the structures associated with it. Structures conceal libidinal intensities while intense feelings and desires force us away from set structures. However, there also can be no intensities or desires without structures, because there would be no dream of escaping the repressive structures if they do not exist. "Libidinal energy comes from this disruptive intervention of external events within structures that seek order and self-containment." This was the first of Lyotard's writings that had really criticized a Marxist view. It achieved great success, but was also the last of Lyotard's writings on this particular topic where he really opposed the views of Marx.

Les Immatériaux
In 1985, Lyotard co-curated the exhibition Les Immatériaux at the Centre de Création Industrielle at the Centre Georges Pompidou in Paris, together with the design theorist and curator Thierry Chaput. At that point, Les Immatériaux was the largest exhibition held at the Centre Georges Pompidou. The exhibition was framed in a pre-1989 context that predicted globalization to be a melancholy foreshadowing of contemporary art's shifting function in the era of increasing transnational exchange, and as a turning point in a history of exhibits in the aftermath of what was formerly known as aesthetics.

John Rajchman says this about the exhibition: "We might imagine Les Immatériaux as an extravagant staging of a peculiar moment in the role of information in the history of aesthetics after so-called ‘modernism’, yet before the ‘contemporary’ configuration of biennials that was already taking shape in the 1990s, within or against which the question of a new ‘history of exhibition’ now itself arises."

"Mainmise"
Lyotard was impressed by the importance of childhood in human life, which he saw as providing the opportunity of creativity, as opposed to the settled hubris of maturity.  In "Mainmise", however, he also explored the hold of childhood experience on the individual through the (Roman) concept of mancipium, an authoritative right of possession. Because parental influences affect the new-born before it has the linguistic skill even to articulate them, let alone oppose them, Lyotard considered that "We are born from others but also to others, given over defenseless to them. Subject to their mancipium."

Later life and death

Later works that Lyotard wrote were about French writer, activist, and politician, André Malraux. One of them was a biography, Signed, Malraux, another an essay entitled Soundproof Room. Lyotard was interested in the aesthetic views of society that Malraux shared. Another later Lyotard book was The Confession of Augustine: a study in the phenomenology of time. This work-in-progress was published posthumously in the same year of Lyotard's death. Two of his later essays on art were on the artwork of artist Bracha L. Ettinger: Anima Minima (Diffracted Traces), 1995, and Anamnesis (L'anamnese), 1997.

Lyotard repeatedly returned to the notion of the Postmodern in essays gathered in English as The Postmodern Explained to Children, Toward the Postmodern, and Postmodern Fables. In 1998, while preparing for a conference on postmodernism and media theory, he died unexpectedly from a case of leukemia that had advanced rapidly. He is buried in Division 6 of Père Lachaise Cemetery in Paris.

Criticism

There are three major criticisms of Lyotard's work. Each coincides with a school of thought. Jacques Derrida and Jean-Luc Nancy have written deconstructions of Lyotard's work (Derrida 1992; Nancy 1985). They focus on Lyotard's postmodern work and on The Differend in particular. A differend depends upon a distinction drawn between groups that itself depends upon the heterogeneity of language games and genres of discourse. Why should these differences be privileged over an endless division and reconstruction of groups? In concentrating on specific differences, Lyotard's thought becomes overly dependent on differences; between categories that are given as fixed and well defined. From the point of view of deconstruction, Lyotard's philosophy gives too much credit to illegitimate categories and groups. Underlying any differend there is a multiplicity of further differences; some of these will involve crossing the first divide, others will question the integrity of the groups that were originally separated.

Manfred Frank (1988) has put the Frankfurt School criticism best. It attacks Lyotard's search for division over consensus on the grounds that it involves a philosophical mistake with serious political and social repercussions. Lyotard has failed to notice that an underlying condition for consensus is also a condition for the successful communication of his own thought. It is a performative contradiction to give an account that appeals to our reason on behalf of a difference that is supposed to elude it. So, in putting forward a false argument against a rational consensus, Lyotard plays into the hands of the irrational forces that often give rise to injustice and differ ends. Worse, he is then only in a position to testify to that injustice, rather than put forward a just and rational resolution. In turn, these criticisms have been met with responses arguing that Frank misreads Lyotard's work, for example, failing to recognize the role of the sublime, as well as failing to see that Lyotard wants to go beyond the monopoly of the cognitive, argumentative genre, in order to give other genres a right to exist as well.

From a Nietzschean and Deleuzian point of view (James Williams 2000), Lyotard's postmodern philosophy took a turn toward a destructive modern nihilism that his early work avoids. The different and the sublime are negative terms that introduce a severe pessimism at the core of Lyotard's philosophy. Both terms draw lines that cannot be crossed and yet they mark the threshold of that which is most valuable for the philosophy, that which is to be testified to and its proper concern. It is not possible repetitively to lend an ear to the sublime without falling into despair due to its fleeting nature. Whenever we try to understand or even memorize: the activity of testimony through the sublime, it can only be as something that has now dissipated and that we cannot capture.

Charles J. Stivale reviewed Lyotard's The Differend (in English translation) in 1990, stating:

Influence
The collective tribute to Lyotard following his death was organized by the Collège International de Philosophie, and chaired by Dolores Lyotard and Jean-Claude Milner, the College's director at that time. The proceedings were published by PUF in 2001 under the general title Jean-François Lyotard, l'exercice du différend.

Lyotard's work continues to be important in politics, philosophy, sociology, literature, art, and cultural studies. To mark the tenth anniversary of Lyotard's death, an international symposium about Jean-François Lyotard organized by the Collège International de Philosophie (under the direction of Dolores Lyotard, Jean-Claude Milner and Gerald Sfez) was held in Paris from January 25–27 in 2007.

Miscellaneous 

 In Pierre Gripari's novel Pierrot la lune, he writes about a Lyotard, who is given the name "Jef" in the novel, saying that he was the only person with whom he could open up about his homosexuality: "I do not understand Jef, but I need him."
In a 1984 interview with Georges Van Den Abbeele, Lyotard discusses how he views all the work he's published as rough drafts, noting that, "Even Le différend (1984), which I spent nine years elaborating and writing, remains a sketch, whose master I have not been. And in this sense, I can without lying plead limited responsibility. That is to say: a reader cannot incorrectly locate in a piece of writing an aspect which, according to me, is not at all there."
 Lyotard was quoted as having privately said, in a conversation with David Hawkes, that "capital is the enemy".

Selected publications
Phenomenology. Trans. Brian Beakley. Albany: State University of New York Press, 1991 [La Phénoménologie. Paris: Presses universitaires de France, 1954], .
Discourse, Figure.  Trans. Antony Hudek and Mary Lydon.  Minneapolis: University of Minnesota Press, 2011 [Discours, figure.  Paris: Klincksieck, 1971], .
Libidinal Economy. Trans. Iain Hamilton Grant. Bloomington: Indiana University Press, 1993 [Économie libidinale. Paris: Éditions de Minuit, 1974], .
Duchamp's TRANS/formers. Trans. Ian McLeod. California: Lapis Press, 1990 [Les transformateurs Duchamp. Paris: Editions Galilée, 1977], .
Just Gaming. Trans. Wlad Godzich. Minneapolis: University of Minnesota Press, 1985 [Au juste: Conversations. Paris: Christian Bourgois, 1979], .
The Postmodern Condition: A Report on Knowledge. Trans. Geoffrey Bennington and Brian Massumi. Minneapolis: University of Minnesota Press, 1984 [La Condition postmoderne: Rapport sur le savoir. Paris: Éditions de Minuit, 1979], .
Pacific Wall. Trans. Bruce Boone. California: Lapis Press, 1989 [Le mur du pacifique. Paris: Editions Galilée, 1979].
The Differend: Phrases in Dispute. Trans. Georges Van Den Abbeele. Minneapolis: University of Minnesota Press, 1988 [Le Différend. Paris: Éditions de Minuit, 1983].
The Assassination of Experience by Painting – Monory. Trans. Rachel Bowlby. London: Black Dog, 1998 [L’Assassinat de l’expérience par la peinture, Monory. Bègles: Castor Astral, 1984].
Driftworks. Ed. Roger McKeon. New York: Semiotext(e), 1984.  [Essays and interviews dating from 1970 to 1972.]
Enthusiasm: The Kantian Critique of History.  Trans. George Van Den Abbeele. Stanford: Stanford University Press, 2009 [L'enthousiasme, la critique kantienne de l'histoire.  Paris: Galilée, 1986].
The Postmodern Explained: Correspondence, 1982–1985. Ed. Julian Pefanis and Morgan Thomas. Trans. Don Barry. Minneapolis: University of Minnesota Press, 1993 [Le Postmoderne expliqué aux enfants: Correspondance, 1982–1985. Paris: Galilée, 1986].
The Inhuman: Reflections on Time. Trans. Geoffrey Bennington and Rachel Bowlby. Stanford, CA: Stanford University Press, 1991 [L’Inhumain: Causeries sur le temps. Paris: Galilée, 1988].
Heidegger and "the jews." Trans. Andreas Michael and Mark S. Roberts. Minneapolis: University of Minnesota Press, 1990 [Heidegger et "les juifs." Paris: Galilée, 1988].
The Lyotard Reader. Ed. Andrew Benjamin. Oxford: Blackwell, 1989.
Peregrinations: Law, Form, Event. New York: Columbia University Press, 1988 [Pérégrinations: Loi, forme, événement. Paris: Galilée, 1990].
Lessons on the Analytic of the Sublime: Kant’s Critique of Judgment, §§ 23–29. Trans. Elizabeth Rottenberg. Stanford, CA: Stanford University Press, 1994 [Leçons sur l’"Analytique du sublime": Kant, "Critique de la faculté de juger," paragraphes 23–29. Paris: Galilée, 1991].
The Hyphen: Between Judaism and Christianity. Trans. Pascale-Anne Brault and Michael Naas. Amherst, NY: Humanity Books, 1999 [Un trait d’union. Sainte-Foy, Quebec: Le Griffon d’argile, 1993].
Political Writings. Trans. Bill Readings and Kevin Paul Geiman. Minneapolis: University of Minnesota Press, 1993.  [Political texts composed 1956–1989.]
Postmodern Fables. Trans. Georges Van Den Abbeele. Minneapolis: University of Minnesota Press, 1997 [Moralités postmodernes. Paris: Galilée, 1993].
Toward the Postmodern. Ed. Robert Harvey and Mark S. Roberts. Atlantic Highlands, NJ: Humanities Press, 1993.  [Essays composed 1970–1991].
Signed, Malraux. Trans. Robert Harvey. Minneapolis: University of Minnesota Press, 1999 [Signé Malraux. Paris: B. Grasset, 1996].
The Politics of Jean-François Lyotard. Ed. Chris Rojek and Bryan S. Turner. New York: Routledge, 1998.
The Confession of Augustine. Trans. Richard Beardsworth. Stanford, CA: Stanford University Press, 2000 [La Confession d’Augustin. Paris: Galilée, 1998].
Soundproof Room: Malraux’s Anti-Aesthetics. Trans. Robert Harvey. Stanford, CA: Stanford University Press, 2001 [Chambre sourde: L’Antiesthétique de Malraux. Paris: Galilée, 1998].
Jean-François Lyotard : Writings on Contemporary Art and Artists, Six volumes. Ed. Herman Parret, Leuven: Leuven University Press, 2010–2013.
Jean-François Lyotard: The Interviews and Debates. Ed. Kiff Bamford. London and New York: Bloomsbury Academic, 2020.
Readings in Infancy. Ed. Robert Harvey and Kiff Bamford. London and New York: Bloomsbury Academic, 2023.

See also
Aestheticism
Spatial turn

References
Notes

Further reading
Bamford, Kiff. Jean-François Lyotard: Critical Lives. London: Reaktion Books, 2017.
Bamford, Kiff. Lyotard and the "figural" in Performance, Art and Writing. London: Bloomsbury, 2012.
Callinicos, Alex. Social Theory: A Historical Introduction. New York: New York University Press, 1999.
Elliott, Anthony, and Larry J. Ray. "Jean Francois Lyotard." Key contemporary social theorists. Malden, MA: Blackwell Publishers, 2003.
Ford Derek R. Inhuman Educations: Jean-Francois Lyotard, Pedagogy, Thought. Leiden: Brill. 2021.
Grebowicz, Margret. Gender After Lyotard. SUNY Press, 2007.
Lemert, Charles C.. "After Modern." Social theory: the multicultural and classic readings. Boulder, Colo.: Westview Press, 1993.
Lewis, Jeff. Cultural Studies. London: Sage, 2008.
Lyotard, Dolorès, et al. Jean-François Lyotard. L'Exercice du Différend (with essays by Alain Badiou, Jean-Luc Nancy, Jacques Derrida, Jean-Claude Milner). Paris: Presses Universitaires de France, 2001.
Mann, Doug. "The Postmodern Condition." Understanding society: a survey of modern social theory. Don Mills, Ont.: Oxford University Press, 2008.
Parker, Noel. The A–Z Guide to Modern Social and Political Theorists. London: Prentice Hall/Harvester Wheatsheaf, 1997.
Readings, Bill. Introducing Lyotard: Art and Politics. New York: Routledge, 1991.
Robbinis, Derek, ed. 2004 J.F. Lyotard. Sage Publishing.
Sica, Alan. Social Thought: From the Enlightenment to the Present. Boston: Pearson/Allyn and Bacon, 2005.
The critical analysis of David Harvey in his book The Condition of Postmodernity (Blackwell, 1989).

External links

Internet Encyclopedia of Philosophy: Jean-François Lyotard
Jean-Francois Lyotard at European Graduate School (Biography, bibliography, quotes and web resources)
The Postmodern Condition: A Report on Knowledge (The first 5 chapters)
International symposium. Collège International de Philosophie January 25–27, 2007 
Les Immatériaux: A Conversation with Jean-François Lyotard

1924 births
1998 deaths
People from Versailles
20th-century French philosophers
Continental philosophers
Critical theorists
Deconstruction
French literary theorists
Philosophers of art
Postmodern theory
Postmodern writers
French rhetoricians
Burials at Père Lachaise Cemetery
Emory University faculty
University of Paris alumni
Deaths from leukemia
French male writers
Libertarian socialists
French Marxists
French modern pagans
French feminist writers
Male feminists
Modern pagan philosophers
Academic staff of Paris 8 University Vincennes-Saint-Denis